Allan Forbes Gentleman is a former member of the Scottish National Swimming Team and five times World Masters Swimming Champion (Aarhus, August 1989). He is a film director, writer and actor. He has worked in the British television and film industry since 1998.

His father Robert Forbes Gentleman (born 28 August 1923) was a British water polo player who competed in the 1948 Summer Olympics.

References

Scottish male swimmers
Living people
Year of birth missing (living people)